Continuity of Employment (Seafarers) Convention, 1976 is  an International Labour Organization Convention.

It was established in 1976, with the preamble stating:
Having noted the terms of Part IV (Regularity of Employment and Income) of the Employment of Seafarers (Technical Developments) Recommendation, 1970, and

Having decided upon the adoption of certain proposals with regard to continuity of employment of seafarers, ...

Ratifications
As of 2022, the convention had been ratified by 17 states. Of the ratifying states, 13 have subsequently denounced the treaty.

External links 
Text.
Ratifications

International Labour Organization conventions
Treaties concluded in 1976
Treaties entered into force in 1979
Treaties of Brazil
Treaties of Costa Rica
Treaties of Cuba
Treaties of Egypt
Treaties of the Hungarian People's Republic
Treaties of Ba'athist Iraq
Treaties of Italy
Treaties of New Zealand
Treaties of Portugal
Admiralty law treaties
Treaties of the Netherlands
Treaties extended to Aruba
1976 in labor relations